The Austrian Sports Badge (German: Das Österreichische Sport- und Turnabzeichen, ÖSTA) is a decoration presented for physical fitness by the Republic of Austria.

History
The Austrian Sports Badge was created in 1920 as a sports badge, similar to other sports badges offered by Germany or Sweden. 
The decoration is awarded in gold, silver, and bronze. 
The Austrian Sports Badge can also awarded to juveniles and to disabled persons with special requirements.

Requirements
Requirements vary according to age, gender, and the class.

The badge
There is a basic (Grundstufe) and an advanced (Leistungsstufe) badge depending on the physical fitness of the participant. The age classes are separated in three divisions that are denoted by the Olympic noble metals:
 Bronze: age 18–29 
 Silver: age 30–39
 Gold: age 40 and above

For youth (age 13–18) there are only three classes; Bronze, Silver and Gold. The level of the badge is calculated with both age, gender and level of physical fitness.

Upon successful completion of the requirements, a certificate and the badge as cloth patch are awarded. Receiving the award as a metal badge is optional. Depending on regulations, the badge may be worn on uniforms.

Repetitive completions of the award are indicated by numbers (5, 10, 15, 20, etc.) on the award.

Ribbon bars
An official Austrian ribbon for the badge does not exist.

See also
German Sports Badge

References

Links
http://www.oesta.at/de (in German)

Sports trophies and awards
Sport in Austria
Austrian awards
Awards established in 1920